Balsfjord is a municipality in Troms og Finnmark county, Norway. The administrative centre of the municipality is the village of Storsteinnes. Other villages include Mestervik, Mortenhals, and Nordkjosbotn.

The  municipality is the 58th largest by area out of the 356 municipalities in Norway. Balsfjord is the 168th most populous municipality in Norway with a population of 5,576.

The municipality surrounds two fjords: Malangen and Balsfjorden, surrounded by comparatively rich farmlands under majestic peaks including the southern end of the Lyngen Alps.

General information
Balsfjord was originally a part of the great Tromsøe landdistrikt municipality, but it was separated from this in 1860 to form its own municipality. Balsfjord had an initial population of 3,610. On 1 January 1871, the northwestern part of the municipality (population: 1,425) was separated from it to create the new Malangen Municipality. This left Balsfjord with 2,255 inhabitants. On 1 January 1875, a part of Lyngen Municipality (population: 7) was transferred to Balsfjord. On 1 January 1905, a part of Balsfjord (population: 5) was transferred to Målselv Municipality.

During the 1960s, there were many municipal mergers across Norway due to the work of the Schei Committee. On 1 January 1964, most of Balsfjord Municipality was merged with most of neighboring Malangen municipality to form a new, larger municipality of Balsfjord (population: 6,993). Also on that day, the Skogli ved Heia area (population: 2) was transferred to the neighboring Målselv Municipality and the uninhabited Elvebakken farm was transferred to the neighboring Storfjord Municipality. On 1 January 1966, the Sørelvmo area of Balsfjord (population: 131) was transferred to Målselv Municipality.

On 1 January 2020, the municipality became part of the newly formed Troms og Finnmark county. Previously, it had been part of the old Troms county.

Name
The municipality is named after the local fjord: Balsfjorden. The meaning of the first element is uncertain, but is likely associated with the Norse god Baldr or the Old Norse word bals meaning lump.

Coat of arms
The coat of arms was granted on 21 November 1986. The official blazon is "Gules, a plough Or". This means the arms have a red field (background) and the charge is a plough. The plough has a tincture of Or which means it is commonly colored yellow, but if it is made out of metal, then gold is used. This symbolizes the fact that the main source of income in the municipality is agriculture. The plough also symbolizes that the municipality is at the northernmost limits of where grain can be grown (and ploughs used) in Norway. The arms were designed by Arvid Steen.

Churches
The Church of Norway has two parishes within the municipality of Balsfjord. It is part of the Indre Troms prosti (deanery) in the Diocese of Nord-Hålogaland.

History

The local inhabitants are descendants of a mixture of Norwegian, Sami and Kven people. Due to the assimilation processes carried out by the Norwegian government, today very few traces of Sami and Kven culture survive. From the 18th century until the 20th century, trappers from Balsfjord were active in the Arctic, hunting in areas from Greenland to Novaya Zemlya.

Mindekirken movement
According to the book Tromsø City History written by Nils Andreas Ytreberg (1896–1987) (published in Norwegian), during the mid-19th century, Balsfjord became the religious home of a group of "mindekirken" or "freechurch dissenters" who split from the state church parish in Tromsø. The mindekirken movement in the Troms region was led by the seminary student, Johannes Andreas Johannessen Bomstad (born at Balsfjord on 23 August 1821), who split from the state church at the age of 28, under the leadership of the first Norwegian mindekirken movement leader, Rev. Lammers from Oslo. In 1856, Bomstad and his original followers established their own church which they called the "Free Apostolic Christian Church" in Balsfjord.

"Rev. Bomstad" and his followers were said to have struggled and protested against the Tromsø state church minister and the Troms Bishop's religious rulings, eventually leading to a riot in the town of Tromsø, when state-church members yelled at Bomstad and his fellow dissenters to "go back to Kautokeino (A small village in the most northern districts of Norway)". In 1862, Bomstad led a group of "mindekirken colonists" to America, traveling first to Bergen, where they sailed in mid-May 1862 aboard the Sleipner, arriving at the inland port of Chicago, Illinois on 2 August 1862. Their voyage was also noteworthy as the first transatlantic voyage sailing directly from Europe to the port of Chicago (other previous transoceanic ships disembarked first at Quebec City, Canada.)  After arriving in Chicago, the mindekirken colonists traveled overland to the area of St. Peter, Minnesota, where they remained during the "Dakota War of 1862".

Rev. Bomstad left St. Peter traveling by mule to Kandiyohi County, Minnesota, where near the east bank of a lake (previously called "Lake Lillian"), he became the founding father of Lake Lillian, Minnesota in May 1864 (one hour ahead of the town's next settler, Mr. O.E. Hart, previously of New York). After staking his original claim, a month later on 3 June 1864, Rev. Bomstad led the rest of the colonists from St. Peter to their new settlement at Lake Lillian, where they built dugout shelters to live in that first year (on the site later occupied by the First M.E. Methodist Church of Lake Lillian.) A few months later he and his family finished building and moved into their log cabin home.

Government
All municipalities in Norway, including Balsfjord, are responsible for primary education (through 10th grade), outpatient health services, senior citizen services, unemployment and other social services, zoning, economic development, and municipal roads. The municipality is governed by a municipal council of elected representatives, which in turn elect a mayor.  The municipality falls under the Nord-Troms District Court and the Hålogaland Court of Appeal.

Municipal council
The municipal council  of Balsfjord is made up of 19 representatives that are elected to four year terms. The party breakdown of the council is as follows:

Climate

Economy
Farming is the single most important industry, although there is also some manufacturing. The Tine dairy factory at Storsteinnes is one of the largest producers of the Norwegian brown cheese (brunost). They also make their own brand of cheese, called Balsfjord, from goat's milk.

Transportation
European route E6 and European route E8 meet at the village of Nordkjosbotn, making it a major crossroad.

Attractions
Apart from the impressive scenery, attractions include the 6000-year-old rock carvings at Tennes (close to the Balsfjord Church), the old trading centre of Nordby, a Sami camp at Heia open over the summer months and the 18th century sawmill at Aursfjord. There is also a smaller field of rock carvings at Åsli. The Malangen Brygger resort on the water's edge has opened on the Malangen Peninsula and will expand further in May 2010 when a hotel and conference centre open.

Notable people
Notable people that were born or lived in Balsfjord include:
 Andreas Beck (1864 in Balsfjord – 1914) a seal-hunter, polar captain, ice captain, shipowner and explorer
 Lillemor von Hanno (1900 in Balsfjord – 1984) a Norwegian actress, novelist and playwright 
 Sverre Heim (born 1951 in Balsfjord) a Norwegian physician, cancer researcher and chess player 
 Gunda Johansen (born 1952) local politician, Mayor of Balsfjord municipality since 2003
 Kent-Are Antonsen (born 1995 in Storsteinnes) a Norwegian footballer, has played 180 games for Tromsø

References

External links
 Municipal fact sheet from Statistics Norway
 
 
 

 
Municipalities of Troms og Finnmark
Populated places of Arctic Norway
1860 establishments in Norway